The Metro Athletic Conference (also known as the Dallas Athletic Conference) is a junior college athletic conference within the National Junior College Athletic Association (NJCAA) Region 5. The conference consists of six junior colleges located in Dallas County, Texas.

Sports
The Metro Athletic Conference consists of the sponsored sports:

 baseball
 men's basketball
 men's soccer
 women's soccer
 volleyball.

Member schools

Current members
The Metro currently has six full members, all but two are public schools:

Notes

See also
 National Junior College Athletic Association (NJCAA)
 North Texas Junior College Athletic Conference, also in Region 5
 Western Junior College Athletic Conference, also in Region 5

References

External links
 NJCAA Region 5 official website
 NJCAA official website

NJCAA conferences
College sports in Texas
Sports in Dallas